Komlan Kalipe (born 11 January 1943) is a Togolese boxer. He competed in the men's welterweight event at the 1972 Summer Olympics. At the 1972 Summer Olympics, he lost to Jesse Valdez of the United States.

References

External links
 

1943 births
Living people
Togolese male boxers
Olympic boxers of Togo
Boxers at the 1972 Summer Olympics
Place of birth missing (living people)
Welterweight boxers
21st-century Togolese people